Llandrinio Bridge, Llandrinio, Powys, Wales, is a road bridge over the River Severn. Constructed between 1769 and 1775, the bridge is attributed to John Gwynn of Shrewsbury, a noted local architect who designed a number of crossings over the Severn, as well as Magdalen Bridge in Oxford. The bridge is also the site of defensive structures dating to World War II, including a pillbox disguised as an agricultural cowshed and Dragon's teeth tank traps at its northern end.  The bridge is a Grade I listed structure and a Scheduled monument.

History and description
Archdeacon Thomas, in his History of the Parish of Llandrinio published in 1895, suggested that the site of Llandrinio Bridge represented an ancient crossing, and identified a reference to a medieval ferry in a charter of 1309. The present bridge was built between 1769 and 1775, almost certainly to the designs of John Gwynn. Gwynn, a native of Shrewsbury, designed a number of crossings over the River Severn, including the English Bridge in his home town, and Atcham Bridge in Shropshire.  He also worked in Oxford, designing the Covered Market and Magdalen Bridge.

At the outbreak of World War II, plans were made for the defence of Britain in the event of a German invasion. In the west, a defensive line, Western Command Stop Line No.1, followed the line of the Severn from Tewkesbury to Shrewsbury. The line crossed the river at Llandrinio, and the bridge was fortified with a pillbox disguised as an agricultural shed and Dragon's teeth tank traps at its northern end.

The Severn at Llandrinio is susceptible to flooding, which can lead to frequent closure of the bridge. In 2015, particularly severe flooding led to fears that the bridge was at risk of collapse. Subsequent investigations showed that several of the bridge's keystones had been removed by the floodwaters and a major programme of structural repair was required.

Llandrinio Bridge is constructed of pink sandstone. Three arches span the river at a length of 45 metres. Scourfield and Haslam, in their Powys volume of the Pevsner Buildings of Wales, describe Llandrinio as a "humped narrow roadway, yet a most graceful line when seen from the [river] bank." The bridge is a Grade I listed structure and a Scheduled monument.

Notes

References

Sources
 

Bridges completed in 1775
Bridges in Powys
Bridges across the River Severn
Grade I listed bridges in Wales
Grade I listed buildings in Powys
Road bridges in Wales